Hiroshima Peace Memorial Ceremony is an annual Japanese vigil.

Every August 6, "A-Bomb Day", the city of Hiroshima holds the Peace Memorial Ceremony to console the victims of the atomic bombs and to pray for the realization of lasting world peace. The ceremony is held in front of the Memorial Cenotaph in the Hiroshima Peace Memorial Park. Participants include the families of the deceased and people from all over the world. The first ceremony was held in 1947 by the then Hiroshima Mayor Shinzo Hamai.

Contents of the ceremony

Dedication of Water (by the citizen representatives of Hiroshima), accompanied (since 1975) by the music "Prayer Music No. 1: Dirge" by Hibakusha composer Masaru Kawasaki
Opening
Dedication of the Register of the Names of the Fallen Atomic Bomb Victims
Address
Dedication of flowers
Silent Prayer and Peace Bell (for one minute from 8:15am)
The bell is rung by one representative of bereaved families and one representative of children
Peace Declaration (by Mayor of Hiroshima)
Release of Doves
Commitment to Peace (by Children's representatives)
Addresses (by Prime Minister of Japan and other visitors)
Hiroshima Peace Song, with music by Minoru Yamamoto and lyrics by Yoshio Shigezono
Closing

Memorial ceremonies for Hiroshima outside Japan
Due to the dissemination of the memorial culture surrounding Hiroshima worldwide, memorial ceremonies were and are being held also in other parts of the world. One such instance was on Aug. 6, 1986, as a delegation from Hiroshima of 18 individuals arrived at the Israeli Holocaust memorial of Yad Vashem and held a brief ceremony at the Yizkor Hall.

United States

In 2010, John V. Roos became the first United States ambassador to Japan to attend the ceremony, paving the way for a historic visit to Hiroshima by then President Barack Obama six years later.

See also
 Hiroshima Peace Memorial Park
 Atomic bombings of Hiroshima and Nagasaki
 Hiroshima Witness

References

External links

 Hiroshima Peace Memorial Ceremony 
 Peace Declarations 
 Hiroshima Peace Camp 2011
 Hiroshima Peace Memorial Ceremony 2009
  Offering of water, 5,635 names added to the list of victims, making 263,945 in total
 Offering of flowers, minute's silence for the victims
 Peace Declaration by Mayor of Hiroshima
 Commitment to Peace by students
 Addresses by Prime Minister of Japan, by Governor of Hiroshima Prefecture
 by president of the United Nations General Assembly, by  the Secretary-General of the United Nations
 Chorus of Hiroshima Peace Song
 Sheet music for Dirge and Peace Song

Monuments and memorials concerning the atomic bombings of Hiroshima and Nagasaki
Peace monuments and memorials
Ceremonies in Japan
Annual events in Japan
August observances
Summer events in Japan